Jenner is a surname.

Notable people with the name include:

Surname
 Barry Jenner (1941–2016), American actor
 Blake Jenner (born 1992), American actor and singer
 Boone Jenner (born 1993), Canadian ice hockey player
 Brandon Jenner (born 1984), American reality TV star and musician
 Brody Jenner (born 1983), American reality TV star and model
 Caitlyn Jenner (born 1949), American decathlete
 Edward Jenner (1749–1823), English physician, developed the smallpox vaccine
 Frank Jenner (1903–1977), English Australian evangelist
 Greg Jenner (born 1982), British historian and author
 Gustav Jenner (1865–1920), German composer
 Henry Jenner (1848–1934), British historian and Cornish language expert
 Kendall Jenner (born 1995), American supermodel
 Kirby Jenner, performance artist
 Kitty Lee Jenner (1853–1936), British author
 Kris Jenner (born 1955), American television personality and socialite
 Kylie Jenner (born 1997), American reality TV star and business woman
 Leo Jenner (born 1989), Canadian athlete (see Plymouth Whalers)
 Michelle Jenner (born 1986), Spanish actress
 Peter Jenner (born 1943), English record producer
 Terry Jenner (1944–2011), Australian cricketer
 Timothy Jenner (born 1945), British air marshal
 Sir William Jenner, 1st Baronet (1815–1898), 19th-century English physician  
 William E. Jenner (1908–1985), American politician
 William John Francis Jenner (born 1940), British sinologist

Fictional characters
 Edwin Jenner, fictional character in The Walking Dead
 Jenner, fictional character in The Secret of NIMH

English-language surnames
Surnames of English origin
Surnames of Scottish origin
Surnames of Welsh origin
Surnames of British Isles origin